George W. Prigmore was a state legislator and government official in Arkansas. He served in the Eighteenth Arkansas Legislature in 1871. He married Anna Elliott.

See also
Prigmore House

References

Members of the Arkansas Territorial Legislature